Lammersville Unified School District is a school district in Mountain House, California and serves the area of Mountain House and rural Tracy.

History
On January 20, 2010 San Joaquin County education committee gave its approval to the proposal for Lammersville to break away from Tracy Unified, which the district has worked toward since 2008. Lammersville residents on June 8, 2010  voted to form the Lammersville Unified School District.The district will separate from Tracy Unified and form an independent school district on July 1, 2011.

Schools

Established schools

Wicklund Elementary School, Mountain House
Bethany Elementary School, Mountain House
Lammersville Elementary School, Mountain House
Sebastian Questa Elementary School, Mountain House 
Altamont Elementary School, Mountain House (2014)
Hansen Elementary School, Mountain House

References

External links
 

School districts in San Joaquin County, California